The 2011 Ball State Cardinals football team represented Ball State University in the 2011 NCAA Division I FBS football season. The Cardinals were led by first-year head coach Pete Lembo and played their home games at Scheumann Stadium. They were a member of the West Division of the Mid-American Conference. They finished the season 6–6, 4–4 in MAC play to finish in a tie for fourth place in the West Division.

Schedule

Roster

References

Ball State
Ball State Cardinals football seasons
Ball State Cardinals football